Ferdinand Giovanni Schediwy (4 June 1804 – 12 October 1877) was a Norwegian conductor, composer, organist and teacher. He immigrated from Prague to Bergen, Norway, where he became very active in the musical environment. He was Edvard Grieg's first music teacher and became leader of the Bergen Philharmonic Orchestra (then called Harmonien) in 1827.

Ferdinand Giovanni Schediwy is not related to Franz Schediwy, founder and owner of a company under the same name in Ludwigsburg, Germany, which manufactured and sold fine brass instruments for orchestral use. The firm, F. Schediwy, manufactured a line of well built brass that is an uncommon find today. A few examples can be seen on the internet at http://www.horn-u-copia.net/cgi-bin/yabb2/YaBB.pl?num=1130591348/3

Norbert Bobble of Ditzingen, Germany, at his Musik Bopple Brass Manufacturing and Repair Shop,
is the last of the trained lineage repair experts of the F. Schediwy brass instruments. His website can found in English and German at http://www.jbs-brass.com/

References

1804 births
1877 deaths
Musicians from Bergen
19th-century Norwegian composers
19th-century conductors (music)